Sebastian Lund Hausner (born 11 April 2000) is a Danish professional footballer who plays as a centre-back for Allsvenskan club IFK Göteborg.

A native of Tyrsted, a suburb of Horsens, Hausner progressed through various youth teams in the area, most notable AC Horsens, before moving to the AGF youth academy in 2014 at age 14. He broke through to the first team in 2017, and became established as a starter in defense in the 2019–20 season under head coach David Nielsen.

He has played for several national youth teams, and was called up for his country at under-21 level in August 2020.

Club career

Early career
Growing up in Tyrsted, a southern suburb of Horsens, Hausner started playing football as a six-year-old for local club FC Horsens. At under-13 level he moved to Horsens fS, which became the youth academy of AC Horsens – the major professional club in the area – a year after his arrival. As a defensive midfielder, he was part of the team winning the Jutland Championship for U13-teams in his first year at the club. At under-14 level, Hausner grew into team captain, and was lauded for his leadership and aggressive playing style.

AGF
In November 2014, 14-year old Hausner joined AGF from AC Horsens. One and a half year later, he signed his first youth contract with the club.

In March 2017, Hausner was called up to the first team for the Danish Cup quarterfinal against his former club AC Horsens. AGF was under pressure due to the many injuries in the defence but Hausner did not make his debut in that game. Two months later, he was promoted into the first team squad permanently at the age of 17. In the following season, Hausner sat on the bench for four games in the Danish Superliga.

His official debut came on 26 September 2018 in the Danish Cup against Aarhus Fremad where he played the last 15 minutes. Hausner also got his Danish Superliga debut in March 2019 against Vendsyssel FF.

In July 2019, he signed a four-year contract extension to his contract for four years. That season, he experienced his breakthrough for the club under head coach David Nielsen, making 18 appearances – 17 as a starter – in the Superliga, as AGF finished in third place and secured medals for the first time since 1997.

At the same time as teammate Albert Grønbæk, Hausner signed another contract extension in mid-December 2020, valid until the end of 2025. He remained a starter in defense for most of the 2020–21 season, as AGF once again qualified for the championship round and finished in the top spots in the league table. Due to his performances, rumours of a summer move materialised. On 20 May 2021, Hausner made a mistake that led to Mikael Uhre from Brøndby IF scoring the 2–1 winner, bringing the club one game away from their first league title in 16 years. Afterwards, he received online threats and accusations of match fixing. Director of communication in AGF Søren Højlund Carlsen called the accusations "violent", and said that "they were derogatory terms from the ugliest side of the dictionary, which must stop," and further called for a "need to talk to each other properly".

International career
Hausner played six times for the under-16 national team in 2016 and in 11 games for the under-17 from 2016 to 2017. From 2017 to 2018 Hausner played in 6 games for the under-18 and from 2018 to 2019 in 4 games for the Denmark under-19 team.

On 24 August 2020, Hausner was called-up by Denmark under-21 national coach Albert Capellas for the squad for the 2021 UEFA European Under-21 Championship qualifiers against Ukraine and Northern Ireland.

Career statistics

References

External links
Sebastian Hausner at DBU

2000 births
Living people
People from Horsens
Danish men's footballers
Danish expatriate footballers
Association football defenders
Denmark youth international footballers
Denmark under-21 international footballers
Sportspeople from the Central Denmark Region
AC Horsens players
Aarhus Gymnastikforening players
IFK Göteborg players
Danish Superliga players
Allsvenskan players
Danish expatriate sportspeople in Sweden
Expatriate footballers in Sweden